Autoimmune skin disease in dogs are a group of diseases that occur in dogs that are caused by the body's immune system, where the body's white blood cells or body's antibodies attack its own tissues or extracellular protein of the skin.

Overview 

The immune system has the ability to differentiate between the body's own cells and foreign cells. However, in the dogs affected by auto-immune disease, the immune system loses the ability to distinguish between body's own cells and foreign cells, causing their immune system to attack the body's own cells. Autoimmune diseases in the base layer of the epidermis are characterized by damage to the connective tissue and vesicle formation located below the epidermis layer and the dermis layer below it.

Clinical symptoms 

Dogs suffering from autoimmune diseases of the skin may experience a variety of symptoms, including persistent itching and scratching, lesions, wounds, blisters, and other skin damage, as well as loss of skin pigment. Two cases of autoimmune diseases that are often found include Discoid lupus erythematosus (DLE) and Pemphigus. DLE can develop into Systemic Lupus Erythematosus (SLE).

The initial stage of DLE is marked by a loss of skin pigment. The skin becomes red and sores appear on the nose. The palate can undergo erosion, ulceration, and injury to the nasal palate, as well as damage to the nostrils and the tissue around the eyes and ears. In chronic and severe cases, visual scar tissue often occurs.

In infections caused by Pemphigus vulgaris, lesions are usually evident in the oral cavity. Sometimes symptoms are characterized by lymphadenopathy, which is characterized by loss of appetite, weakness, fever, and in rare cases, sepsis. Pemphigus foliaceus usually affects areas of the ears and face. Early symptoms are characterized by depigmentation of the nasal palate, dorsal cleft in the mouth, the ear, and the periocular area around the eye. Itching, pain, and weakness of the body have been observed in some cases.

Disease incidence process 
There are two mechanisms of tolerance found in the immune system. The first mechanism is positive selection by the thymus, where only T cells are selected. T cells recognize peptides in the Histocompatibility Complex (MHC). The second mechanism is negative selection, where T cells that recognize self-antigens with too high an affinity are removed through the process of apoptosis and are not allowed to enter the body's circulation.

See also
 Dog skin disorders

References 

Autoimmune diseases
Dog diseases
Cutaneous conditions